Laurence J. Whalen (born 1944) is a retired senior judge of the United States Tax Court.

He was born in Pennsylvania and earned his A.B. from Georgetown University, 1967; J.D., Georgetown University Law Center, 1970, followed by an LL.M. in 1971. He has been admitted to the District of Columbia and Oklahoma Bars. Special Assistant to the Assistant Attorney General, Tax Division, Department of Justice, 1971–72; trial attorney, Tax Division, 1971–75. Private law practice in Washington, D.C., with Hamel and Park (now Hopkins, Sutter, Hamel and Park), 1977–84; also in Oklahoma City, Oklahoma, with Crowe & Dunlevy, 1984–87. He is a member of the Oklahoma Bar Association, District of Columbia Bar Association, and American Bar Association.

Whalen was appointed by President Reagan as Judge, United States Tax Court, on November 23, 1987, for a term ending November 22, 2002. Retired on November 23, 2002, but continues to perform judicial duties as Senior Judge on recall.

References

1944 births
Judges of the United States Tax Court
United States Article I federal judges appointed by Ronald Reagan
20th-century American judges
Living people
21st-century American judges
Georgetown University alumni
Georgetown University Law Center alumni